Akka is a 1976 Indian Tamil-language thriller film, directed by Madurai Thirumaran. The film stars K. R. Vijaya, Vijayakumar, Vijayabala and Jai Ganesh. It was released on 22 October 1976.

Plot

Cast 
K. R. Vijaya
Vijayakumar
Jai Ganesh
Vijayabala
R. S. Manohar
Thengai Srinivasan
V. K. Ramasamy
M. N. Rajam
Manorama
Suruli Rajan
V. S. Raghavan

Soundtrack
The soundtrack was scored by M. S. Viswanathan, with lyrics by Kannadasan.

Reception
Kanthan of Kalki praised the performances of cast but felt the film did not have the best cinematography while also appreciating the director for maintaining the thrills and suspense throughout the film.

References

External links 
 

1970s Tamil-language films
1970s thriller films
1976 films
Films scored by M. S. Viswanathan
Indian thriller films